Kathleen Griffin may refer to:

 Kathleen Griffin (camogie), former camogie player
 Kathy Griffin (Kathleen Mary Griffin, born 1960), American actress, comedian and television personality

See also 
 Kate Griffin (disambiguation)